English singer Emma Bunton has released four studio albums, 15 singles (including one as a featured artist) and 12 music videos. Her debut solo album A Girl Like Me was released in the United Kingdom on 16 April 2001 by Virgin Records. The album debuted and peaked at number four on the UK Albums Chart. On 7 September 2001, A Girl Like Me was certified gold by the British Phonographic Industry for sales in excess of 100,000 copies, ultimately becoming the 147th best-selling album in the UK for 2001. The album brought the UK number-one "What Took You So Long?" as well as top-five hits "What I Am" (a cover of a 1988 song by Edie Brickell & New Bohemians) and "Take My Breath Away" and the top 20 hit "We're Not Gonna Sleep Tonight". The album sold 127,000 copies in the UK.

Bunton's second album, Free Me, was released in 2003 through 19 Entertainment/Universal Records. Four singles were taken from it: "Free Me", "Maybe", "I'll Be There" and "Crickets Sing for Anamaria". After some success in the American dance charts the album was sold in North America. The American edition included remixes and a different cover. "Downtown" was released on 13 November 2006 and charted at number three in the UK. Life in Mono was released as Bunton's third album on 4 December 2006, and peaked at number 65 in the UK. The second and final single from the album, "All I Need to Know", was released in February 2007 and charted at 60 in the UK. In November 2012, she released a new single with former bandmate Melanie C titled "I Know Him So Well", from Melanie's sixth album Stages.

Studio albums

Singles

As lead artist

As featured artist

Promotional singles

Other charted songs

Guest appearances

Music videos

Writing credits

References

External links
 Official website
 
 

Discographies of British artists
Discography
Pop music discographies